Černé vdovy (Black Widows) is a Czech television series that has been broadcast by Prima televize since 17 February 2019. Jana Plodková, Jitka Čvančarová and Lucia Siposová starred in the series. It is written by Radek Bajgar, Pavel Gotthard, Mirka Zlatníková, Michaela Sabo and Milan Tesař. Radek Bajgar is also the director. Černé vdovy is an adaptation of Finnish series Mustat lesket.

In March 2022, filming began for the second season consisting of 8 episodes.

Cast
 Jana Plodková as Renata Jůzlová
 Jitka Čvančarová as Johana Rychnovská
 Lucia Siposová as Veronika Majerová
 Bolek Polívka as a criminalist Olin Nekula
 Filip Blažek as Mirek Jůzl, Renata's husband
 Pavla Beretová as Billy, bartender and Mirek's lover
 Jan Vondráček as Petr Písařík
 Martin Myšička as Erik, psychologist who is Renata's neighbor
 Jan Hájek as Josef Kašpar (Sagi)
 Dana Batulková as Aštanga, Renata's mother
 Jiří Maryško as Alex
 Marek Lambora as Filip Rychnovský
 Pavel Šimčík as Ing. Jonáš
 Claudie Černá as Líza Jůzlová
 Martin Stránský as Daniel Rychnovský
 Petr Vršek as Jan Majer

References

External links 
Official site
IMDB site
ČSFD site

Czech crime television series
Czech comedy television series
2019 Czech television series debuts
Prima televize original programming
Czech television series based on non-Czech television series